Morenia is a genus of turtles in the family Geoemydidae found in India, Bangladesh, and Burma.
It contains only these species:

 Burmese eyed turtle (M. ocellata)
 Indian eyed turtle (M. petersi)

It is also in the name of a Robotic Operating System (ROS) distribution release: Melodic Morenia.

References

 
Turtle genera
Taxa named by John Edward Gray
Taxonomy articles created by Polbot